Hook 'Em Snotty! is the fifth novel in World of Adventure series by Gary Paulsen.  It was published on May 1, 1995, by Random House.

Plot
The story is about Bobbie Walker whose cousin Alex has come from the city to visit their grandpa's ranch, but they take an immediate dislike to one another. When the cousins cross paths with the wild bull Diablo and the nasty Bledsoe boys, they must find a way to get along or it could be the end of them both.

Publication
It was later turned into a three part omnibus along with Danger on Midnight River and Escape from Fire Mountain by Random House on February 14, 2006.

Novels by Gary Paulsen
1995 American novels
American young adult novels
Random House books